Kulundinsky District is an administrative and municipal district (raion), one of the fifty-nine in Altai Krai, Russia. It is located in the west of the krai. Its administrative center is the rural locality (a selo) of Kulunda. As of the 2010 Census, the total population of the district was 23,000, with the population of Kulunda accounting for 63.2% of that number.

Geography
The district is located in the area of the Kulunda Steppe, at the southern edge of the West Siberian Plain.

History
The district was established on January 18, 1935 as Kiyevsky (Novo-Kiyevsky) District within West Siberian Krai. When Altai Krai was established in 1937, the district became a part of it. In June 1938, the administrative center of the district was transferred to Kulunda, and the district was given its present name as a result.

References

Notes

Sources

Districts of Altai Krai
States and territories established in 1935
